PD 144418 or 1,2,3,6-tetrahydro-5-[3-(4-methylphenyl)-5-isoxazolyl]-1-propylpyridine is a potent and selective ligand for the sigma-1 receptor, with a reported binding affinity of Ki = 0.08 ± 0.01 nM, and 17 212 times selectivity over the sigma-2 receptor.

References

Tetrahydropyridines
Ligands (biochemistry)